Wyalusing is a borough in Bradford County, Pennsylvania, United States. It is part of Northeastern Pennsylvania. The population was 596 as of the 2010 census.

History 

The history of Wyalusing dates back centuries. It was originally known as M'chwihilusing. The Moravian Christian Munsees for several years had a settlement Friedenshuetten (Tents of Peace) in what is now Wyalusing. Before 1750, the settlement was known as Gahontoto and was home to the Tehotachsee tribe of Native Americans. This small tribe would eventually be completely wiped out by the Cayuga tribe. In 1792, the chief of the Cayugas and approximately 20 other families rebuilt the town.

In the 19th century, the town began to prosper as it became a shipping area for logs and other items on the Susquehanna River. In 1820, the construction of the Welles Mill along Wyalusing Creek made Wyalusing a prime area for people to farm and raise crops. In 1887, Wyalusing became a borough. Many of the buildings constructed in the late 19th century and early 1920s are still part of Main Street today.

Wyalusing is home to one of the biggest beef processing plants on the East Coast. Cargill regional beef Wyalusing is located just a couple miles outside of town. This plant was originally started in the late 1970s by the local Taylor family as a small meat processing plant. It eventually grew into a multimillion-dollar business that employs over 1,200 people from the surrounding area. Cargill is one of the biggest suppliers of ground beef to large grocery chains such as Wegmans, Giant, Shop Rite and more. In 2002, the Taylor family sold the business to the Cargill corporation, one of the largest privately owned companies in the United States.

The Wyalusing Path was a historic trace that ran from what is now Wyalusing to the Native American village of Canaserage (what is now Muncy, on the West Branch Susquehanna River).

Geography
Wyalusing is located in southeastern Bradford County at  (41.667407, -76.263375). It is on the northeast bank of the Susquehanna River at the confluence with Wyalusing Creek. The borough is bordered on the north, east, and south by Wyalusing Township and on the west, across the Susquehanna, by Terry Township.

U.S. Route 6 passes through the center of the borough, following the Susquehanna River. It leads southeast  to Tunkhannock and northwest  to Towanda, the Bradford County seat. Pennsylvania Route 706 leaves northeast from the center of the borough, leading  to U.S. Route 11 and Interstate 81 at New Milford.

Demographics

As of the census of 2000, there were 564 people, 264 households, and 145 families residing in the borough. The racial makeup of the borough was 98.40% White, 0.35% African American, 0.89% Native American, and 0.35% from two or more races. Hispanic or Latino of any race were 1.06% of the population.

There were 264 households, out of which 23.1% had children under the age of 18 living with them, 43.6% were married couples living together, 8.3% had a female householder with no husband present, and 44.7% were non-families. 39.8% of all households were made up of individuals, and 22.3% had someone living alone who was 65 years of age or older. The average household size was 2.05 and the average family size was 2.75.

In the borough the population was spread out, with 20.6% under the age of 18, 6.6% from 18 to 24, 22.9% from 25 to 44, 24.5% from 45 to 64, and 25.5% who were 65 years of age or older. The median age was 45 years. For every 100 females, there were 78.5 males. For every 100 females age 18 and over, there were 77.8 males.

The median income for a household in the borough was $30,625, and the median income for a family was $41,429. Males had a median income of $33,393 versus $21,250 for females. The per capita income for the borough was $27,229. About 4.9% of families and 12.3% of the population were below the poverty line, including 5.8% of those under age 18 and 24.2% of those age 65 or over.

Attractions 

Scenic attractions include the Wyalusing Rocks and the Marie Antoinette Lookout.

Community events include Wyalusing's Fall Festival and Street Fair, the Wyalusing Firemen's Parade, the Camptown Races, and the Wyalusing Wine festival.

Education

Newspapers 
Wyalusing is home to The Rocket Courier, the result of the merger of The Wyalusing Rocket, founded in 1887, and The Wyoming County Courier, Founded in 1923. The Rocket Courier covers the surrounding Wyalusing area, as well local towns nearby. The Rocket is locally owned by editor W. Dave Keeler. It is printed in Wyalusing and puts out a new issue every Thursday morning.

The Daily Review, founded in Towanda in 1879, acquired by the publishers of the Scranton Times in 1977 (now part of Times-Shamrock Communications), also provides Wyalusing coverage, serving Towanda, Bradford, and Sullivan counties, as well as Tioga County, New York.  The Daily Review is printed in Towanda Township.

Winery 
The Grovedale Winery participates in the annual Wyalusing Valley Wine Festival, which is hosted by the Wyalusing Valley Museum Association, Inc. This festival offers wine tasting, food, and dancing with many wineries from Northeastern Pennsylvania in attendance each year.

Notable people 
 Joyce Steele (1935-2019), All-American Girls Professional Baseball League player.
 Lucas Steele, Tony award nominated actor.
 Philip Van Doren Stern (1900-1984), author and historian who wrote the original story to It's a Wonderful Life.
 Johnny Swendel (1927-2022), country musician.

References

External links
 Borough of Wyalusing official website
 Borough of Wyalusing page in Bradford County, PA website
 Greater Wyalusing Chamber of Commerce
 Wyalusing Valley Museum

Boroughs in Bradford County, Pennsylvania
1793 establishments in Pennsylvania
Populated places established in 1793
Pennsylvania populated places on the Susquehanna River